Henry County Public Schools operates 14 schools - two high schools, two middle schools, and ten elementary schools - a community learning center, and a regional alternative program.  HCPS operates preschool programs at ten elementary schools.

History

According to a thesis written by Eugene Carol Hoover in 1939 a Dr. J.M. Smith who was superintendent of the county schools from 1876 to 1885 wrote a history of education in the county, in which he said prior to 1850 Henry County virtually had no school history worth reporting.  From 1846 to 1851, there was a brief experiment in Henry County with district free schools, which led to a violent political upheaval and culminated in abandonment of the experiment.

According to Jean Hairston the first superintendent of Schools in Henry County was Mr. Greenberry T. Griggs who served from 1870 to 1876.  In 1871 Mr. Griggs reported there were 19 one room schools operating for white children and 10 operating for black children.  These schools were in session for about four and a half months.  In 1901 it was reported there were 75 schools for white children and 32 for the black children.  Schools at this time went for five and a half months.  All the schools only served grades 1-7.

Administration

Superintendent 
The current superintendent of Henry County Public Schools is Sandy Strayer. Prior to her appointment in 2018, Strayer served as interim superintendent, Assistant Superintendent for Teaching and Learning, and an administrator in Henry County.

School Board 
There are 7 members of the Henry County School Board:

 Thomas Auker, Chairman
 Elizabeth Durden
 Terri C. Flanagan
 Ben Gravely
 Teddy Martin II, Vice Chairman
 Cherie Whitlow
 Francis E. Zehr

Schools

High schools
 Bassett High School
 Magna Vista High School

Middle schools
 Fieldale-Collinsville Middle School
 Laurel Park Middle School

Elementary schools
 Axton Elementary School
 Campbell Court Elementary School
 G. W. Carver Elementary School
 Drewry Mason Elementary School
Meadow View Elementary
 Mount Olivet Elementary School
 Rich Acres Elementary School
 Sanville Elementary School
 Stanleytown Elementary School

Others Sites
 Adult Education Center
 Center for Community Learning
 Career Academy

See also
 List of school divisions in Virginia

References

External links
 

School divisions in Virginia
Education in Henry County, Virginia